Christophe Juillet (born 20 March 1969, in Villeneuve-sur-Lot, France) is a French former international rugby union footballer who also played for France national team.

Career 
As Number 8 he played for several French clubs: he debuted in the French championship in 1989 with Montferrand, where he was runner-up in the French championship. In 1998 he moved to Stade Français where he won two French championships.

As an international he won 18 full caps for France and took part in the 1999 Rugby World Cup, where France were runners-up. His last international game was against Ireland during the 2001 Six Nations.

Honours

Club 
 Challenge Yves du Manoir winner (1999) with Stade Français
 French Rugby Union Championship/Top 14: 1997–98, 1999–2000

International 
 18 full caps, 2 tries with France
 Runner-up at the 1999 Rugby World Cup

References

External links 
ESPN profile

People from Villeneuve-sur-Lot
1969 births
Living people
French rugby union players
France international rugby union players
Sportspeople from Lot-et-Garonne
Rugby union number eights